The Real Housewives of New Jersey (abbreviated RHONJ) is an American reality television series that premiered on May 12, 2009, on Bravo. Developed as the fourth installment of The Real Housewives franchise, it has aired twelve seasons and focuses on the personal and professional lives of several women residing in the U.S. State of New Jersey.

The cast of the current thirteenth season consists of Teresa Giudice, Melissa Gorga, Dolores Catania, Margaret Josephs, Jennifer Aydin, Danielle Cabral and Rachel Fuda, with former housewife Jackie Goldschneider and Jennifer Fessler serving as friends of the housewives. Previously-featured cast members include original housewives Dina Cantin, Jacqueline Laurita, Caroline Manzo and Danielle Staub; and subsequent housewives Kathy Wakile, Teresa Aprea, Amber Marchese, Nicole Napolitano, and Siggy Flicker.

The success of the show has resulted in the spin-offs Manzo'd with Children and Teresa Checks In.

Overview and casting

Seasons 1–5 
The Real Housewives of New Jersey was announced by Bravo on April 15, 2008. The first season premiered on May 12, 2009, and starred Caroline Manzo, Jacqueline Laurita, Teresa Giudice, Dina Cantin and Danielle Staub with Dolores Catania as a friend of the housewives. For the first time in The Real Housewives franchise, the series followed cast members who are related to one another: sisters Caroline Manzo and Dina Cantin were at the time married to brothers Albert and Tommy Manzo, and Laurita is married to Caroline and Dina's brother, Chris Laurita. Dina and Tommy Manzo would later end up separated. The second season premiered on May 3, 2010, with Dina Manzo departing the series after the seventh episode. Staub left the show after the second season.

The third season premiered on May 16, 2011, with new housewives Melissa Gorga and Kathy Wakile. It delivered the highest rated season premiere in Bravo's history and the highest rated season premiere in The Real Housewives franchise at the time. The fourth season premiered on April 22, 2012. This season served as Dolores Catania's final season as a friend until Season 7 where she would become a main cast member. The fifth season premiered on June 2, 2013. Caroline Manzo and Laurita left the show after the fifth season.

Seasons 6–8 
The sixth season premiered on July 13, 2014. It featured the return of Dina Manzo as a full-time cast member and new cast members Amber Marchese, Teresa Aprea and Nicole Napolitano. Wakile was demoted to a "friend of the housewives" role, while Laurita also appeared as a guest.  Aprea, Cantin and Napolitano left the show, while Marchese was fired after the sixth season.

Laurita returned as a full-time cast member in the seventh season, which premiered on July 10, 2016. The season also featured Dolores Catania and Siggy Flicker as new cast members, Dolores Catania was a friend of the show for the first four seasons and was originally cast for the show in Season 1 but backed out due to personal reasons. Kathy Wakile and Rosie Pierri appeared as "friends of the housewives". Aprea and Napolitano also appeared as guests. The season marked as the final appearance of Laurita, Wakile and Pierri in the show. Staub returned in the show as a "friend of the housewives" for the eighth season, which premiered on October 4, 2017. It also featured Margaret Josephs as the new cast member. Flicker left the show afterwards.

Seasons 9–12 
The ninth season premiered on November 7, 2018, featuring Jennifer Aydin and Jackie Goldschneider joining the cast. While Staub returned as a friend once again. The tenth season premiered on November 6, 2019. The season marked Staub's final appearance, as she announced her resignation from the show for the second time in January 2020.

Filming for the eleventh season was postponed by Bravo in March 2020 due to the COVID-19 pandemic. The eleventh season premiered on February 17, 2021 The twelfth season premiered on February 1, 2022 with Traci Johnson added as a friend of the housewives.

Season 13–present 
The thirteenth season premiered on February 7, 2023, with new full-time housewives Danielle Cabral and Rachel Fuda joining the cast, as well as Jennifer Fessler appearing as a friend of the housewives, alongside former housewife Jackie Goldschneider.

Timeline of cast members

Episodes

Broadcast history
The Real Housewives of New Jersey airs regularly on Bravo in the United States; most episodes are approximately forty-two minutes in length, and are broadcast in standard definition and high definition. Since its premiere, the series has alternated airing on Monday, Tuesday, Wednesday, Thursday, and Sunday evenings and has been frequently shifted between the 8:00, 9:00, and 10:00 PM timeslots.

Spin-offs 
The series' success has resulted in a development of spin-off series. Caroline Manzo's children Albie and Chris had a web series spin-off alongside their roommate and friend Greg Bennett, Boys to Manzo which premiered on May 30, 2011. Caroline Manzo, who was part of the original cast of the show, quit the series due to involvement in the production of a new show, Manzo'd with Children. The show premiered on October 5, 2014 on Bravo. The reality series follows the daily life of Manzo and her family, and lasted for three seasons.

In October 2015, a three episode spin-off, entitled Teresa Checks In premiered. It featured the life of the Giudice family during the aftermath of Teresa Giudice's being sentenced to prison. The series featured cast members of The Real Housewives of New Jersey, Melissa Gorga and Rosie Pierri.

In December 2018, an after show featuring season 9's cast was released online through Bravo.com and YouTube. It featured their reactions to the most recent episode and thoughts on the season. An after show for the tenth season started streaming online on December 11, 2019.

Giudice and Melissa Gorga starred in the first season of the spin-off The Real Housewives Ultimate Girls Trip on Peacock, traveling to Turks and Caicos alongside several other Housewives cast members from other cities’ franchises.

References

External links 

 
 
 
 

 
2009 American television series debuts
2000s American reality television series
2010s American reality television series
2020s American reality television series
Bravo (American TV network) original programming
English-language television shows
Television productions suspended due to the COVID-19 pandemic
Television shows filmed in New Jersey